The 2013 Asian Karate Championships are the 12th edition of the Senior Asian Karate Championships and 13th edition of the Cadet, Junior & U21 Asian Karate Championships and were held in Dubai, United Arab Emirates from December 5 to December 7, 2013.

Medalists

Men

Women

Medal table

References
 Results (Archived version)

External links
 akf-karatedo.com

Asian Championships
Asian Karate Championships
Asian Karate Championships
Karate Championships
Asian Karate Championships
Sports competitions in Dubai